Mishan-e Olya may refer to:
 Mishan-e Olya, Chaharmahal and Bakhtiari
 Mishan-e Olya, Fars